Philadelphus  is the scientific name of mock-oranges, a genus of shrubs.

Philadelphus is the Latinized form of the ancient Greek Philadelphos (meaning "brother-loving" or "sibling-loving"), it may also refer to:

People:
 Antiochus XI Ephiphanes Philadelphus (d. 92 BC), king of the Seleucid Empire 95-92 BC
 Attalus II Philadelphus (220–138 BC), king of Pergamon 160- 138 BC
 Iotape Philadelphus (before 17- c. 52 AD), princess and later queen of Commagene
 Laodice VII Thea Philadelphus (after 122- after 86 BC), princess of the Seleucid Empire and later queen of Commagene
 Mithridates IV Philopator Philadelphus (before 179- c.150 BC), king of Pontus c.155 –c.150 BC
 Philip I Philadelphus, king of the Seleucid Empire 95 BC-84/83 BC
 Ptolemy Philadelphus (son of Cleopatra) (36-29 BC), prince of Ptolemaic Egypt 36 BC-30 BC, son of Mark Antony
 Ptolemy II Philadelphus (309–246 BC), king of Ptolemaic Egypt 283 BC-246 BC
 Arsinoe II, given the epithet "Philadelphoi" (plural form) after marrying her brother Ptolemy II Philadelphus
 Ptolemy XII Auletes (Philopator Philadelphos), Ptolemaic king
 Philadelphus of Byzantium, bishop of Byzantium 211-217 AD
 Deiotarus Philadelphus (died c.6 AD), last king of Paphlagonia before 31 BC-c.6AD
  Philadelphos/Philadelphus, Christian martyrs commemorated in the Eastern Orthodox liturgical calendar on February 8, May 10 and September 2
 Philadelphus Philadelphia, stage name of Jacob Philadelphia

Other uses:
 Philadelphus Jeyes, the chain of pharmacies operated by the inventors of Jeyes Fluid
 Philadelphus, North Carolina, a Registered Historic Place in Robeson County, North Carolina

See also
 Philadelphia (disambiguation)
 Phyladelphus, a genus of the fly family, Chloropidae
 Philometor (disambiguation), "mother-loving"
 Philopator (disambiguation), "father-loving"
 Eupator (disambiguation), "of noble father"